Kyzyl-Bayrak is a village in the Chüy Region of Kyrgyzstan. Its population was 424 in 2021. Its name translates to "red flag."

References

Populated places in Chüy Region